Athenodorus of Soli was a Stoic philosopher, and disciple of Zeno of Citium, who lived in the 3rd century BC.

He was the son of Athenodorus, and was born in the town of Soli, Cilicia, and was the compatriot of another disciple of Zeno, Chrysippus. Athenodorus was the brother of the poet Aratus of Soli, the author of the long didactic poem, Phaenomena. Both brothers followed the teachings of Zeno.

He is mentioned in the list given by Diogenes Laërtius as the disciple of Zeno.<ref name="diog1">Diogenes Laërtius, vii.</ref> He may be the dedicatee of the work On Definite Propositions'' written by Chrysippus.

Notes

3rd-century BC Greek people
3rd-century BC philosophers
Hellenistic-era philosophers from Anatolia
Stoic philosophers